Duduela is a Rai Coast language, or pair of languages, spoken in Madang Province, Papua New Guinea. Varieties are Uyaji, also known as Uyajitaya, and Amowe.

References

Rai Coast languages
Languages of Madang Province